Dhanusha 3 is one of four parliamentary constituencies of Dhanusha District in Nepal. This constituency came into existence on the Constituency Delimitation Commission (CDC) report submitted on 31 August 2017.Dhanusha 3 is one of the constituency of national importance in Nepal. Due to presence of some projects of national recognition like Rajarshi Janak University, ADB urban development project, Janakpur-Jatahi-Ayodhya 6 lane and Janakpur-Jaynagar railway this constituency is taken as the pocket area of Nepali Congress in regard to development.

Incorporated areas 
Dhanusha 3 incorporates Mukhiyapati Musharniya Rural Municipality, Nagarain Municipality, Dhanauj Rural Municipality, wards 9 of Bideha Municipality and wards 1–8, 10, 12, 15, 16, 20 and 23–25 of Janakpur Sub-metropolitan City.

Assembly segments 
It encompasses the following Province No. 2 Provincial Assembly segment

 Dhanusha 3(A)
 Dhanusha 3(B)

Members of Parliament

Parliament/Constituent Assembly

Provincial Assembly

3(A)

3(B)

Election results

Election in the 2020s

2022 general election

2022 Nepalese provincial elections

3(A)

3(B)

Election in the 2010s

2017 legislative elections

2017 Nepalese provincial elections

3(A)

3(B)

2013 Constituent Assembly election

Election in the 2000s

2008 Constituent Assembly election

Election in the 1990s

1999 legislative elections

1994 legislative elections

1991 legislative elections

See also 

 List of parliamentary constituencies of Nepal

References

External links 

 Constituency map of Dhanusha

Parliamentary constituencies of Nepal